Dimetrodon is the third album from the nerd-folk duo The Doubleclicks, released on June 10, 2014.  The album was funded via Kickstarter with a goal of $18,000.  The campaign exceeded this and raised $80,923, on February 18, 2014, making it the most successful Portland music Kickstarter to date.

Production 
The Doubleclicks sought funding for the album via the crowd-funding site Kickstarter, asking for $18,000. The Kickstarter campaign ended with $80,923 from 1,923 backers; 449% of the sum requested.  This was the most successful Portland music Kickstarter campaign to date and also "legitimized [them] as a true representative of nerds everywhere."

Track listing

References

External links 
 

2014 albums
The Doubleclicks albums
Kickstarter-funded albums
Prehistoric life in popular culture